The Savage River Reservoir is a  storage reservoir in northwest Maryland. It was completed in 1952 by the U.S. Army Corps of Engineers, and is owned and maintained by the Upper Potomac River Commission. The reservoir was formed by the Savage River Dam which impounds the Savage River.

The dam was modified in 1980.

Dimensions:
Height: 184 ft
Length: 1050 ft
Capacity: 31800 acre ft
Normal storage: 20,000 acre ft
Drainage area: 105 square mi  
Maximum discharge: 97,200 cubic ft/sec

In 2007, operation of the reservoir gates failed due to extensive corrosion.  Around $3.9 million of Recovery Act funds were used to drain, repair and reopen the reservoir in 2010.  There has been a gradual recovery of what is now referred to as a "trophy area" for fishermen below the dam.  Big Run has public facilities at the headwaters of the lake.  In April 2009, Savage River Reservoir was named one of the top five Maryland Fishing Waters as well as one of the top 100 rivers by Trout Unlimited.  Savage River below the dam is popular for canoeing competitions and is treasured for its clear water. 
The Savage River primarily flows into the Reservoir, providing fishing and paddling opportunities in a scenic, wilderness setting.  Two boat launches located near the dam provide convenient access.  Fishermen can enjoy fishing for catfish, trout and bass.  In 2008, a population study resulted in the finding that there was an estimated 1,376 wild adult trout per mile in the river.  The Reservoir holds the Rainbow Trout state record weighing in at 14 lbs. 3 oz.  Savage River flows south to the Potomac River, where it drops 85 ft per mile.  With this descent, it is favored by both fishermen and advanced paddlers.  The Potomac River runs through Maryland, West Virginia and Virginia, and eventually into the Chesapeake Bay.

References

Rivers of Garrett County, Maryland
Reservoirs in Maryland